Keighley railway station serves the town of Keighley in West Yorkshire, England.

History
Keighley station first opened on a site slightly further up the line in March 1847 by the Leeds and Bradford Extension Railway. The volume of traffic over the original level crossing in the town, prompted the Midland Railway, which had absorbed the LBER, to spend £60,000 in 1876 building the road bridge immediately to the north of where the present station is located. A new station was built south of this bridge in 1883–1885. The second station was designed by Charles Trubshaw, who was a Midland Railway architect. It is managed by Northern, which operates most of the passenger trains serving it. Electric trains operate frequently from Keighley towards Bradford Forster Square, Leeds and Skipton. Longer distance diesel trains on the Leeds to Morecambe Line and Settle to Carlisle Line also call here.

Keighley is also the northern terminus of the Keighley & Worth Valley Railway. This is a heritage branch-line railway run by volunteers that was originally built by the Midland Railway and opened in 1867. Closed to passenger traffic in 1962, it was reopened by the K&WVR Preservation Society six years later and is now a popular tourist attraction.

The Airedale Line runs from platforms 1 and 2 and Keighley and Worth Valley railway operate from platforms 3 and 4.

There is now no visible trace of this station having ever existed.

In 1986, the station was given a Grade II listing by Historic England as a building of special architectural or historic interest. The listing mentions the main entrance building to be of coursed, dressed millstone grit. The two westernmost platforms have period furnishings including cast-iron lamp posts; on platform 4 a good cast-iron and glass canopy with decorative columns; and on platform 3 an 8-columned arcade, the remains of a canopy, and a late 19th century engine water-filling pump.

Stationmasters

William Simpson ca. 1849 (imprisoned and kept for hard labour for 12 months after pleading guilty to embezzlement)
J. Boothe until 1860
William Torbitt 1860 - 1863
R. Elliott 1863 - ca. 1869
Thomas Warwick 1869 - 1870 (afterwards station master at Lincoln)
Ralph Singleton ca. 1875 - 1884
Henry Towle 1884 - 1890 (formerly station master at Luton)
William S. Carr 1890 - 1900
William Coles 1900 - 1908 (afterwards station master at Skipton)
David Bennett Smith 1908 - 1924 (formerly station master at Manningham)
Herbert M. Read 1924 - 1929 (formerly station master at Clay Cross)
H.S. Dawes from 1929 (formerly station master at Calverley and Rodley)
James P. Richardson 1940 - 1947
F.A. Cooke 1947 - 1953 (formerly station master at Dursley)
M.W. Hesseltine ca. 1955

Facilities

The National Rail side of the station is fully staffed, with the ticket office open seven days a week (except evenings). Train running information is provided via a public address system, posters and digital information screens. A waiting room is available on platform 1 and shelters on platform 2. Step-free access to both platforms from the main entrance is via ramps from the road above, whilst platform 1 also has level access from Dalton Lane.

The K&WVR has its own ticket office and access ramps from the shared main entrance to platforms 3 and 4. They also have a refreshment stand and bookstall on platform 4, which is open when the railway is operating.

Services

During Monday to Saturday daytimes and in the evenings there is a half-hourly service to Leeds, an hourly service to Bradford Forster Square and three trains per hour to Skipton. The Bradford service formerly ran twice-hourly during the day prior to the spring 2022 timetable change.

On Sundays there is an hourly service to Leeds and to Bradford with two per hour to Skipton. The new Northern franchise agreement, starting in April 2016, included provision to increase the Bradford service to hourly from its former two-hourly frequency, and this occurred at the December 2017 timetable change.

There are also a number of trains each day from Leeds to Carlisle (eight on weekdays and six on Sundays) and Lancaster (seven on weekdays with five extended to Morecambe, and five on Sundays) - both routes are operated by Northern.

There is also a daily service from Skipton to London King's Cross (via Leeds) that calls (except Sundays), which is operated by London North Eastern Railway. A return service also operates from King's Cross to Skipton - this runs all week, including Sundays and calls to set down only.

The Keighley and Worth Valley service runs daily during the summer and at weekends in other seasons, but has resisted offers to introduce a true commuter service in conjunction with the local authority. It has a connection to the Airedale Line (via sidings) just north of the Bradford Road bridge for rolling stock transfers and occasional visits by charter trains.

Filming
The station was featured in the Head & Shoulders advert "Don't break up with your hair" in early 2009. The advert uses the platform that serves the Keighley & Worth Valley Railway, notable for the period features that it has retained over the years.

The station was used in the filming of the film Yanks (1979) and in the Pink Floyd film, The Wall (1982). It was used in the filming of Peaky Blinders, a BBC television drama about criminals in Birmingham just after the First World War.

In the first episode of All Creatures Great and Small (2020 TV series), the main character, James Herriot, says goodbye to his parents and boards a train in Glasgow; these scenes were actually filmed at Keighley station. A KWVR train also appears in that episode.

See also
Listed buildings in Keighley

References

PSL Field Guides - Railways of the Eastern Region Volume 2, Geoffrey Body (1988) Patrick Stephens Ltd, Wellingborough, 
Railways Through Airedale & Wharfedale Martin Bairstow (2004)

External links

Buildings and structures in Keighley
DfT Category C2 stations
Grade II listed buildings in West Yorkshire
Charles Trubshaw railway stations
Former Midland Railway stations
Keighley and Worth Valley Railway
Northern franchise railway stations
Railway stations in Bradford
Heritage railway stations in Bradford
Railway stations in Great Britain opened in 1847
Railway stations served by London North Eastern Railway